Maya Entertainment Group, Inc. was an independent multi-platform video distribution company. Moctesuma Esparza founded the company in Los Angeles, California in 2007. Maya Entertainment procured and produced content that appealed to the new diverse American Latino and multi-cultural audiences. The company acquired a library of over 100 titles.

Maya Entertainment launched "Maya at the Movies" with Time Warner Cable. They also participated in The Maya Indie Films Festival, a traveling summer film tour. The festival embodied a culturally diverse cinema and attempted to promote Latino prominence and talent in the film industry and to provide an outlet for independent film exposure.

Maya Entertainment recently released Sympathy for Delicious, a major motion picture starring Mark Ruffalo, Laura Linney, and Orlando Bloom.

History
Founder Moctesuma Esparza was born and raised in Los Angeles. He received a B.A. and MFA in Theatre Arts, Motion Pictures and Television, from UCLA, and has dedicated himself to empowering and transforming the images of Latinos in Hollywood.

Feature films
Theatrical films

 Across the Line: The Exodus of Charlie Wright- starring Aidan Quinn, Mario Van Peebles, and Andy Garcia
 The Dry Land - starring America Ferrera, Jason Ritter, and Wilmer Valderrama
 Sins of My Father (Pecados de mi Padre) - the true story of Pablo Escobar, the infamous boss of Colombia's Medellin drug cartel, as told through the eyes of his son
 Sympathy for Delicious - directed by Mark Ruffalo; starring Ruffalo, Orlando Bloom, Laura Linney and Juliette Lewis
 Without Men - starring Eva Longoria Parker, Christian Slater and Oscar Nunez

International film distribution
International film distribution is currently headed by Elias Axume. Maya Entertainment sells rights to its entertainment properties worldwide and has a large presence at major markets including Berlin Film Festival/European Film Market, Hong Kong FILMART, Cannes Film Festival, MIP-TV, Toronto International Film Festival, MIPCOM and AFM.

Currently

 Across the Line: The Exodus of Charlie Wright - starring Aidan Quinn and Mario van Peebles
 Café - starring Jennifer Love Hewitt and Jamie Kennedy
 The Jesuit - starring Michelle Rodriguez and Willem Dafoe
 La Mission - starring Benjamin Bratt
 Without Men - starring Eva Longoria Parker, Christian Slater and Oscar Nunez

List of releases

References

Sources 

 "The Film Catalogue - Maya Entertainment - Www.thefilmcatalogue.com." The Film Catalogue - Www.thefilmcatalogue.com. Web. 13 June 2011. <http://www.thefilmcatalogue.com/catalog/CompanyDetail.php?id=2965>.
 Maya Entertainment | Home. Web. 13 June 2011. <http://maya-entertainment.com/>.
 "Maya Entertainment Buys Sundance Title 'All She Can' - IndieWIRE." Filmmakers, Film Industry, Film Festivals, Awards & Movie Reviews | IndieWIRE. Web. 13 June 2011. <http://www.indiewire.com/article/maya_entertainment_buys_sundance_title_all_she_can/>.
 "Maya Entertainment Makes Waves in Hollywood | HispanicTips." HispanicTips | The Ultimate Tool for Understanding & Appreciating Hispanics & Latinos :: Empower Yourself. Web. 13 June 2011. <http://www.hispanictips.com/2008/10/08/maya-entertainment-makes-waves-in-hollywood/>.
 "Maya Entertainment Nabs Eva Longoria Parker, Christian Slater Comedy 'Without Men' - The Hollywood Reporter." The Latest Entertainment & Hollywood News - The Hollywood Reporter. Web. 13 June 2011. <http://www.hollywoodreporter.com/news/maya-entertainment-nabs-eva-longoria-74110>.
 "Maya Entertainment [us]." The Internet Movie Database (IMDb). Web. 13 June 2011. <https://www.imdb.com/company/co0136764/>.
 "Our Team | Maya Entertainment." Maya Entertainment | Home. Web. 8 June 2011. <https://web.archive.org/web/20110615234438/http://maya-entertainment.com/our-team>.
 Jacoby, Anna. "FYIDC: The Maya Indie Film Festival." Washington Life Magazine. Web. 13 June 2011. <http://www.washingtonlife.com/2010/07/30/fyidc-the-maya-indie-film-festival/>.

Film distributors of the United States
Hispanic and Latino American culture in Los Angeles